The Arab Belt (al-hizām al-ʿarabī) was the Syrian Baath government's project of Arabization of the north of the Al-Hasakah Governorate to change its ethnic composition of the population in favor of Arabs to the detriment of other ethnic groups, particularly Kurds. It involved the seizure of land which was then settled with Arabs displaced by the creation of Lake Assad.

Background 

The Kurdish rebellion against the Iraqi government led by Mustafa Barzani and the discovery of oil in Al-Jazira Province in the 1960s coincided with a marked worsening for the Kurdish population. On 23 August 1962, the government decreed an extraordinary census of al-Jazira Province. If a person was not able to produce a document that proved they lived in Syrian before 1940, they were deemed illegal immigrants, mainly from Turkey. As part of this census on the 5 October 1962, 120,000 Kurds in the province were deprived of their Syrian citizenship. The Syrian Government later admitted mistakes were made during the census, but didn't reinstate citizenry. In view of the Kurdish uprising in Iraq, the Syrian bureaucrat Muhammad Talab Hilal warned of similar a development in Syria and produced a twelvefold strategy to achieve the Arabization of the al-Jazira Province. The steps were:
 (1) eviction and resettlement of Kurds
 (2) deprivation of all education for Kurds
 (3) removal of Kurds from employment
 (4) the reevaluation of the Syrian citizenships of Kurds also holding a Turkish citizenship
 (5) encouragement of intra-Kurdish factionalism in order to divide and rule
 (6) Arab settlements in former Kurdish lands
 (7) colonization  "pure and nationalist Arabs" to be settled in Syrian Kurdistan so Kurds might be "watched until their dispersion"
 (8) military involvement by divisions stationed in the zone of the cordon would guaranty that the dispersion of the Kurds and the settlement of Arabs would take place according to plans drawn up by the government
 (9) collective farms are to be established by Arab settlers equipped with "armament and training"
 (10) prohibition of "anybody ignorant of the Arabic language exercising the right to vote or stand for office"
 (11) Kurdish religious dignitaries were to be expelled to the south and replaced with Arabs
 (12) "a vast anti-Kurdish campaign amongst the Arabs" to be undertaken by the state

In 1962 the Syrian government adopted the Arab Belt (al-Hizam al-Arabi) policy in order and "save Arabism" and defeat the "Kurdish threat" by expelling all the Kurdish inhabitants from the area of the Syria–Turkey border, dispersing and resettling them, and replacing them with Arabs. Oil had been discovered in Northern Syria and the desire the control the Kurdish region's resources was connected with the policy. The Baath party came to power in 1963 in Syria and decided in 1965 to build the 350 km long and 10-15 km wide Arabic belt along the Syria–Turkey border. The planned belt stretched from the Iraqi border in the east to Ras al-Ayn in the west.

Execution
After another coup within the Baath party, Hafez al-Assad succeeded in becoming the head of Syria in 1970 and began to implement the plan in 1973. The project's name was changed to Plan to establish model state farms in the Jazira region. Villages were built into which were to be settled 4000 Arab families coming from the land which was to be submerged following the completion of the Tabqa dam and the filling of Lake Assad. The Arabs were provided with weapons and divided between more than 50 so-called model farms in the Jazira Region and to the north of Raqqa. Twelve were built each around Qamishli and Al-Malakiyah and sixteen around Ras al Ayn. The Kurdish village names of the area were replaced by Arabic names not necessarily related to the traditions and history of the region. These Arabs are named as Maghmurin (مغمورين Maġmūrīn, which is affected by flooding). The campaign has eventually faded out under Hafez al Assad in 1976, but Kurds were not allowed to return.

Background
The region of the planned belt are rich in oil deposits and fertile agricultural land. About 50 to 60 per cent of the Syrian petroleum caves are estimated to be located in the district of Al-Malikiyah.

References

20th century in Syria
Kurds in Syria
Ethnic groups in Syria
Al-Hasakah Governorate
Upper Mesopotamia
Cultural assimilation
History of the Ba'ath Party
Syrian Kurdistan
Racism in the Arab world
Persecution of Kurds in Syria
Belt regions
Anti-Kurdish sentiment